Oday Abd Al-Jafal (born 27 May 1990), commonly known as Oday Al-Jafal, is a Syrian footballer who plays as a midfielder for the Syrian national team.

Club career
In August 2013, he signed a one-year contract with Oman Professional League club Al-Suwaiq Club.

In July 2017, Al-Jafal signed for the Jordanian club Al-Jazeera.

Club career statistics

International career

Between 2007 and 2008, he played for the Under-17 and the Under-19 Syrian national team, including the Syrian U-17 national team that participated in the FIFA U-17 World Cup 2007 in South Korea.

He played against Honduras in the group-stage of the FIFA U-17 World Cup 2007 and against England in the Round of 16.

He was part of the Syrian U-19 squad in the 2008 AFC U-19 Championship.

He also represented Syria in the 2012 Nehru Cup.

International goals
Scores and results table. Syria's goal tally first:

|}

Honours
Naft Al-Wasat
Iraqi Premier League: 2014–15
Al-Zawraa
Iraqi Premier League: 2015–16

National Team
FIFA U-17 World Cup 2007: Round of 16

References

External links
 
 
 

Living people
1990 births
Syrian footballers
Syria international footballers
Syrian expatriate footballers
Association football midfielders
Expatriate footballers in Jordan
Syrian expatriate sportspeople in Jordan
Al-Shorta Damascus players
Naft Al-Wasat SC players
Najaf FC players
Al-Zawraa SC players
Al-Jazeera (Jordan) players
Al-Jalil players
Suwaiq Club players
Mesaimeer SC players
Al-Markhiya SC players
Expatriate footballers in Oman
Syrian expatriate sportspeople in Oman
Expatriate footballers in Iraq
Syrian expatriate sportspeople in Iraq
Qatari Second Division players
Expatriate footballers in Qatar
Syrian expatriate sportspeople in Qatar
People from Deir ez-Zor
Syrian Premier League players